Tufts Blue is the tone of azure blue used in association with Tufts University. 

Tufts University Relations defines "Tufts Blue" as corresponding to the Pantone color of 279 or the process color of 70c 30m 0y 0k.

See also
Brandeis blue
Columbia blue
Tiffany Blue
List of colors

References

Shades of azure
Shades of blue
Tufts University
School colors